Al-Magharb al-Allya is a sub-district located in Manakhah District, Sana'a Governorate, Yemen. Al-Magharb al-Allya had a population of 3591 according to the 2004 census.

References 

Sub-districts in Manakhah District